Sumatindra Tirtha (c. 1692c. 1725) was a Dvaita scholar and the 20th pontiff of the Madhva matha at Kumbakonam (also known as Raghavendra Matha). Succeeding Surindra Tirtha in 1692, Sumatindra extended the reach of the matha from Kumbakonam to Thanjavur, Madurai and Srirangam. Through his travels and a close association with the royalty, Sumatindra was able to proliferate the principles of Dvaita in the Tamil region.  An accomplished scholar and poet, he has authored numerous works on poetics, drama and music as well as commentaries on Vedanta.

Life
Born as Muddu Krishnacharya, he seems to have studied tarka (Logic), vyakarana (grammar) and mimamsa (scriptural injunctions) under the guidance of Raghavendra  though he considers his father, Venkatanarayana, as his teacher. His two brothers Yogindra and Surindra served as pontiffs of the matha before him. He took on the name of Sumatindra after his initiation into sannyasa. Through his travels in the present day Karnataka and Telangana, he engaged in debates and discussions with Advaita and Dvaita scholars alike.  He maintained cordial relationship with the Madurai Nayaks and the Thanjavur Marathas as evidenced by grants made in his name. Queen Mangamma of Madurai granted him the hamlet of Ayirdharma and lands in the town of Srirangam where he built his matha.  Under his aegis, the matha also received a part of the tithes from Payaranipalyam and other neighboring villages.  His panegyric on the Thanjavur ruler Sahaji I indicates familiarity with the ruler. Succeeded by Upendra Tirtha, he is entombed in Srirangam.

Works
Sumatindra's works span a wide range of subjects, from alankara (poetics) to vedanta. He has authored commentaries on the works of Jayatirtha and Vyasatirtha, while quoting from a variety of sources including Puranas and obscure works from pontiffs of the yore, Padmanabha and Narahari. In the realm of poetics, he has authored a commentary on the works of Sudhindra Tirtha and Trivikrama Pandita, an early disciple of Madhva. His Shahavilasa is a treatise on music while his Abhinavakadambari is a poetic work.

Works on the Brahmasutra

Works on the Alamkara and Kavya

Short metrical verse

References

Bibliography

Madhva religious leaders
Dvaitin philosophers
Dvaita Vedanta
Scholars from Karnataka
History of Karnataka